Noctua fimbriata, the broad-bordered yellow underwing, is a moth of the family Noctuidae. It is found in Europe, North Africa, Anatolia, the Caucasus, Turkey, Caucasus, Transcaucasia, Armenia, Turkmenistan and Novosibirsk Oblast. The border of its southern range is unclear because of the similar looking species Noctua tirrenica.

Technical description and variation

The wingspan is 45–55 mm. The length of the forewings is 22–27 mm. Forewing ranging from pale ochreous and rufous in the female to red-brown and olive-green in the male; ochreous males are rare; markings slight in the female, strong in the male;inner line dark; outer and submarginal pale; upper stigmata large, pale-edged, often touching; a dark costal blotch before submarginal line: hindwing and fringe orange, with a very broad black border; the pale rufous forms are known as ab. rufa Tutt, and the deep red-brown forms as ab. brunnea Tutt; the dark olive-green males are solani F., while the paler more ochreous green specimens (? males) are ab. virescens Tutt; — a rare and handsome form of the males called by Tutt ab. brunnea-virescens has the deep red-brown and olive-green tints combine.
forewing blackish = obscura Lenz.].

Biology
The moth flies in one generation from late June to September.

Larva reddish ochreous, paler at the sides and spotted with brown; dorsal line paler; a dark pale-edged bar across the 12th segment; spiracles pale on dark spots. The larvae feed on Rumex, nettle and low growing woody plants on occasion.

References

External links
Lepiforum
Noctua fimbriata at Markku Savela's Lepidoptera and Some Other Life Forms
Fauna Europaea
Vlindernet 
waarneming.nl 
Lepidoptera of Belgium
Broad-bordered yellow underwing, at UKMoths

Noctua (moth)
Moths described in 1759
Moths of Africa
Moths of Asia
Moths of Europe
Taxa named by Johann Christian Daniel von Schreber